= IRAS 17423−1755 =

Nebula in the constellation Sagittarius

Emission nebula
- Planetary nebula
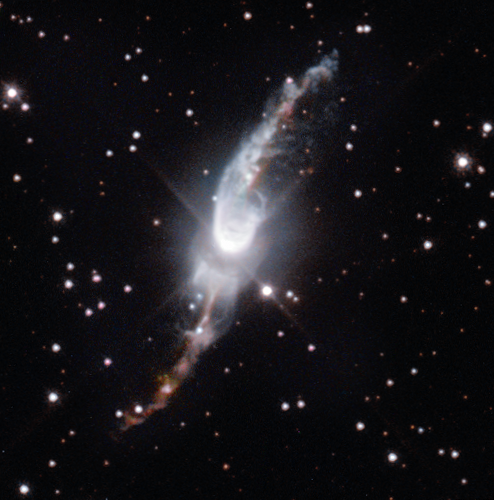
- Planetary nebula IRAS 17423−1755 taken by the Hubble Space Telescope

Observation data: J2000 epoch
- Right ascension: 17^{h} 45^{m} 14.19^{s}
- Declination: −17° 56′ 46.9″
- Distance: 18,000 ly
- Apparent magnitude (V): 12.87
- Constellation: Sagittarius
- Designations: GSC2 S2202023288 , 2MASS J17451419−1756469, PK 009+05 1, DENIS-P J174514.1−175646, GSC 06253-02182, MSX6C G009.3628+05.7782, PN G009.3+05.7, GLMP 632, Hen 3-1475, PDS 465, [NHO98] 17423−1755

IRAS 17423−1755 also known as Henize 3-1475 is a planetary nebula, located in the constellation of Sagittarius around 18,000 light-years away from earth. The central star is around 20,000 times as luminous as the Sun.
